Hypopyra lactipex is a moth of the family Erebidae. It is found on Peninsular Malaysia, Borneo, Sumatra and possibly Sulawesi. The habitat consists of lowland forests, disturbed coastal forests and heath forests.

References

Moths described in 1913
Hypopyra
Moths of Malaysia
Moths of Indonesia